Fern Elementary School may refer to:

 Fern Elementary School, California, United States — Torrance Unified School District
 Mayor Joseph J. Fern Elementary School, Hawaii, United States — See List of elementary schools in Hawaii